George Malley is the name of

George Malley (American football) (1903–1979), American football coach
George Malley (athlete) (born 1955), American steeplechase and long-distance runner